The UK Rock & Metal Singles Chart is a record chart which ranks the best-selling rock and heavy metal songs in the United Kingdom. Compiled and published by the Official Charts Company, the data is based on each track's weekly physical sales, digital downloads and streams. In 2002, there were 19 singles that topped the 52 published charts. The first number-one single of the year was "In Too Deep" by Canadian pop punk band Sum 41, which spent the first four weeks of the year atop the chart. Sum 41 also had the final number-one single of the year, with "Still Waiting" spending the last five weeks of the year atop the chart.

The most successful song on the UK Rock & Metal Singles Chart in 2002 was "How You Remind Me" by Nickelback, which spent twelve weeks at number one. The band also spent three weeks at number one with "Too Bad". Sum 41 spent nine weeks at number one in 2002 – five weeks with "Still Waiting" and four weeks with "In Too Deep" – while Red Hot Chili Peppers spent four weeks at number one, with both "By the Way" and "The Zephyr Song" topping the chart for two weeks. Alien Ant Farm's "Movies" was number one for three weeks, while Puddle of Mudd topped the chart for two weeks with "She Hates Me" and one with "Blurry". "Alive" by P.O.D., "Girl All the Bad Guys Want" by Bowling for Soup, "All My Life" by Foo Fighters and "No One Knows" by Queens of the Stone Age spent two weeks at number one in 2002.

Chart history

See also
2002 in British music
List of UK Rock & Metal Albums Chart number ones of 2002

References

External links
Official UK Rock & Metal Singles Chart Top 40 at the Official Charts Company
The Official UK Top 40 Rock Singles at BBC Radio 1

2002 in British music
United Kingdom Rock and Metal Singles
2002